Lasiothyris taima is a species of moth of the family Tortricidae. It is found in Rio Grande do Sul, Brazil.

The wingspan is about 9 mm. The ground colour of the forewings is creamy, but whiter and glossy pearl beyond the middle. The base and apex area are mixed pale yellowish ochreous and the terminal third of the wing beyond the median cell is suffused ochreous. The hindwings are creamy, but pale brownish on the periphery.

References

Moths described in 2002
Cochylini